The U.S. Attorney for the District of New Jersey is the chief federal law enforcement officer in New Jersey. On December 16, 2021, Philip R. Sellinger was sworn in as U.S. Attorney. The U.S. District Court for the District of New Jersey has jurisdiction over all cases prosecuted by the U.S. Attorney.

Organization 

The Office is organized into divisions handling civil, criminal, and appellate matters, in addition to the Special Prosecutions Division, which oversees political corruption investigations. The District of New Jersey is also divided into three vicinages:  Newark, Trenton and Camden, with the southern two offices supervised by a Deputy U.S. Attorney. The office employs approximately 170 Assistant U.S. Attorneys. It is the fifth-largest U.S. Attorney's Office in the nation, behind those in the District of Columbia, Los Angeles, Manhattan, and Miami.

High-profile cases 

 Hugh Addonizio - Conviction of former Newark mayor on conspiracy and extortion charges
 BitClub Network (2019) - Indicted five individuals for operating and promoting the BitClub Network, an elaborate, worldwide Ponzi scheme that law enforcement estimates took in more than $1 billion from investors.
 Wayne Bryant - Conviction of former chairman of New Jersey Senate Budget & Appropriations Committee for funneling money to the University of Medicine and Dentistry of New Jersey in exchange for a no-show job at the University.
 Joseph Centanni (2020) - Filed a civil rights lawsuit against a major landlord who repeatedly engaged in a pattern or practice of sexual harassment of numerous tenants and applicants.
 Cognizant (2019) - Charged the former President and the former Chief Legal Officer of Cognizant Technology Solutions Corp. with violations of the FCPA in connection with a foreign bribery scheme. 
 Crazy Eddie - Conviction of Eddie Antar, founder and CEO of Crazy Eddie, a consumer electronics chain, for fraud
 Walter Forbes - Conviction of former chairman of Cendant Corporation for fraud.
 EDGAR Hacking Attack (2019) - Indicted Artem Radchenko and Oleksandr Ieremenko for a large-scale, international conspiracy to hack into the Securities and Exchange Commission’s Electronic Data Gathering, Analysis and Retrieval (EDGAR) system and profit by trading on critical information they stole.
 Fort Dix Six (2007) - Conviction of group of six radical Islamist men allegedly plotting attack on Fort Dix military base
 Fort Lee lane closure scandal (2014)
 Cornelius Gallagher - Guilty plea of New Jersey Congressman for tax evasion
 Nelson G. Gross - Conviction of former Republican state chairman on perjury and obstruction of justice charges
 Sharpe James (2008) - Conviction of former Newark mayor on corruption charges
 Robert C. Janiszewski (2002) - Guilty plea of Hudson County Executive for tax evasion and bribery
 John V. Kenny - Conviction of former Jersey City mayor and chairman of Hudson County Democratic Party on conspiracy, bribery, and extortion charges
 Charles Kushner (2004) - Guilty plea of real estate developer—and largest campaign donor to former New Jersey Governor James E. McGreevey—for filing false tax returns and for attempting to retaliate against a witness in a federal criminal case
 Hemant Lakhani (2005) - Conviction of black market arms dealer attempting to sell shoulder-fired missiles
 Gene Levoff (2019) - indicted former Corporate secretary and Director of corporate law at Apple Inc. for orchestrating a five-year insider trading scheme.
 John A. Lynch, Jr. - Guilty plea of former president of New Jersey Senate for mail fraud and tax evasion
 Newark Violent Crime Initiative (VCI) (2018-2020) - awarded an Attorney General’s Award in October 2019 as the model for cooperative law enforcement among federal, state, county and city agencies. The VCI led to a 30 percent reduction in the number of shooting victims city-wide between 2017 and 2018 and another 39 percent decline in 2019. In 2020, a year in which violent crime spiked in various places across the country, Newark maintained the same low in the number of murders.
 Novartis/Alcon (2020) - Two deferred prosecution agreements regarding significant violations of the Foreign Corrupt Practices Act at Greek and Vietnamese subsidiaries of the Swiss pharmaceutical company Novartis, resulting in penalties of $345 million, representing the second largest criminal and regulatory fine imposed against pharmaceutical companies under the FCPA. 
 Operation Bid Rig (2002–2009) - Multi-stage political corruption sweep, resulting in arrest of Hoboken Mayor Peter Cammarano, Secaucus Mayor Dennis Elwell, New Jersey Assemblymen Daniel Van Pelt and L. Harvey Smith, and Jersey City Council President Mariano Vega
  Operation Brace Yourself (2019) - Investigation and prosecution of sweeping durable medical equipment kickback schemes that resulted in the largest healthcare fraud takedown yet pursued by the Department.
 Purdue Pharma (2020) - prosecution of opioid manufacturer Purdue Pharma L.P. for three felonies, including conspiracy to defraud the DEA and Anti-Kickback Statute violations—for its gross misconduct in misbranding and mismarketing OxyContin that amounted to over $8 billion in penalties.
 Samsam Ransomware (2018) - Indicted two Iranians—Faramarz Shahi Savandi and Mohammad Mehdi Shah Mansouri—for conducting the largest ransomware attack in the U.S. that crippled institutions in New Jersey and elsewhere.
 Sarah Brockington Bost (2002), Mayor of Irvington, New Jersey
 Martin Taccetta & Michael Taccetta (1987) - Unsuccessful prosecution of high-ranking members of The Jersey Crew, a faction of the Lucchese crime family
 UMDNJ (2005) - Deferred prosecution agreement overseen by federal monitor Herbert Stern involving Medicaid double-billing and other cases of health care fraud at the University of Medicine and Dentistry of New Jersey.
 Thomas J. Whelan - Conviction of mayor of Jersey City on conspiracy, bribery and extortion charges
 Woodcliff Lake (2018) - Filed a civil rights lawsuit against the Borough of Woodcliff Lake for violations of RLUIPA resulting from the Borough’s efforts to prevent an Orthodox Jewish congregation from building a new place of worship.

Prominent officeholders 

Prominent assistant US attorneys
Samuel Alito - associate justice, U.S. Supreme Court
Carolyn Arch - partner, Arch & Goodwin, Newark, N.J. 
Maryanne Trump Barry - U.S. circuit court judge, Third Circuit
John Winslow Bissell - U.S. district court judge
Matthew Boxer - comptroller, State of New Jersey
Garrett Brown, Jr. - U.S. district court judge
Renée Marie Bumb - U.S. district court judge
Michael Chagares - U.S. circuit court judge, Third Circuit
Michael Chertoff - Former secretary, Department of Homeland Security
Stanley R. Chesler - U.S. district court judge
Chris Christie - Former governor of New Jersey
John Farmer Jr. - Former attorney general, State of New Jersey
Joseph Greenaway - U.S. circuit court judge, Third Circuit
Gurbir Grewal - Former Bergen County prosecutor and former attorney general of New Jersey
Peter C. Harvey - Former attorney general, State of New Jersey
Katharine Hayden - U.S. district court judge
Noel Hillman - U.S. district court judge; Former chief, Public Integrity Section, U.S. Department of Justice
Richard J. Hughes - Former governor of New Jersey; Former chief justice, New Jersey Supreme Court
David Lat - blogger, Underneath their Robes and Above the Law
William Martini - U.S. district court judge; Former congressman (NJ-8)
Stuart Rabner - chief justice, New Jersey Supreme Court
Jerome Simandle - U.S. district court judge
Herbert Stern - former U.S. district court judge; former federal monitor, UMDNJ Medicaid fraud investigation

Officeholders

References

External links 
Official District Court website
Official U.S. Attorney's Office website
Thomas Library of Congress
Video reviewing the first 225 years of the Office of the United States Attorney for the District of New Jersey, 1789-2014

 
New Jersey law
New Jersey lawyers
Newark, New Jersey
Trenton, New Jersey
Camden, New Jersey
Prosecution